Michael Friedlander may refer to:
 Michael Friedländer (1833–1910), Orientalist and principal of Jews' College, London
 Sir Michael Friedlander (businessman) (born 1936), New Zealand businessman and philanthropist knighted in 2016
 Michael W. Friedlander (1928–2021), American physicist and skeptic